Salpinctium is a genus of flowering plants belonging to the family Acanthaceae.

Its native range is Southern Africa.

Species
Species:

Salpinctium hirsutum 
Salpinctium natalense 
Salpinctium stenosiphon

References

Acanthaceae
Acanthaceae genera